FIFA Street is a sports video game developed by EA Canada and published by Electronic Arts under the EA Sports BIG label. It is commentated on by MC Harvey of the So Solid Crew. It was released in February 2005 for PlayStation 2, Xbox, and GameCube. The cover features Brazilian international footballer Ronaldinho.

It was followed by FIFA Street 2, which was released in February 2006.

Gameplay
The game is a spin-off of EA's FIFA series of football games, following the same formula as their other "Street" titles, NFL Street and NBA Street, by reducing the more complete version of the game into a simpler arcade style game. It focuses on flair, style and trickery, as opposed to what FIFA Football focuses on team play and tactics, reflecting the culture of freestyle football played in the streets and backlots across the world.
Using reputation and respect gained from playing 4-on-4 games with tricks and flair, the aim of FIFA Street is to build a team up of well-known and recognised players including Ronaldo and Ronaldinho to progress through street venues across the world.

Reception

The game received "mixed" reviews on all platforms according to video game review aggregator Metacritic.

The PlayStation 2 version of FIFA Street received a "Platinum" sales award from the Entertainment and Leisure Software Publishers Association (ELSPA), indicating sales of at least 300,000 copies in the United Kingdom.

References

External links

2005 video games
Electronic Arts franchises
Electronic Arts games
EA Sports games
EA Sports Big games
Street
Association football video games
Street football video games
GameCube games
Mobile games
PlayStation 2 games
Video games developed in Canada
Xbox games
Multiplayer and single-player video games